is a passenger railway station located in Minami-ku of the city of Okayama, Okayama Prefecture, Japan. It is operated by the West Japan Railway Company (JR West).

Lines

Station layout
The station consists of two opposed ground-level side platforms connected by a footbridge. The station is unattended.

Platforms

Adjacent stations

History
Bizen-Kataoka Station was opened on 1 January 1939.With the privatization of Japanese National Railways (JNR) on 1 April 1987, the station came under the control of JR West.

Passenger statistics
In fiscal 2019, the station was used by an average of 235 passengers daily

Surrounding area
Okayama City Minami Ward Office Nadasaki Branch
Okayama Municipal Nadasaki Town History and Culture Museum
Okayama Municipal Nadazaki Elementary School
Okayama Municipal Nadasaki Junior High School

See also
List of railway stations in Japan

References

External links

 JR West Station Official Site

Railway stations in Okayama
Uno Line
Railway stations in Japan opened in 1939